Rainer Brinkmann may refer to:
Rainer Brinkmann (admiral) (born 1958), German Navy admiral and Deputy Inspector of the Navy
Rainer Brinkmann (politician) (born 1958), German politician of the Social Democratic Party